Pool C of the 2021 Rugby World Cup began on 8 October 2022 with France taking on South Africa at Eden Park. The pool includes two-time champions England and France, who finished 2nd and 3rd respectively in 2017. They are joined by South Africa, who qualified as champions of the 2021 Rugby Africa Women's Cup, and by debutants Fiji, who qualified for the tournament with their win over Samoa.

Standings 
All times are local New Zealand Daylight Time (UTC+13)

South Africa vs France

Notes:
 Joanna Grisez (France) made her international debut.

Fiji vs England

Notes:
 This was the first meeting between the two nations.
 This was Fiji's first World Cup game.
 England's 84 points was the highest number of points they have scored in a World Cup game, surpassing the 82 points they scored against Kazakhstan in 2010.

France vs England

Notes:
Sarah Hunter earned her 137th test cap, equalling Rochelle Clark's record for most caps for England and most caps for a female player.
Marjorie Mayans (France) earned her 50th test cap.
This was France's first defeat in the pool stage since losing 27–8 to England in 2006.

Fiji vs South Africa

Notes:
This was the first meeting between the two nations.
Zenay Jordaan earned her 35th test cap, surpassing Zandile Nojoko as the most capped South African female.

France vs Fiji

Notes:
This was the first meeting between the two nations.

England vs South Africa

Notes:
England became the first women's side to play 300 test matches.
Marlie Packer captained England for the first time.
Victoria Cornborough and Emily Scarratt were initially named on the England bench at 17 and 22, but withdrew due to injury. Maud Muir was demoted to the bench from tighthead and Shaunagh Brown was added to the starting team, while Ellie Kildunne, replaced Scarratt, pushing Helena Rowland to 22.

Notes

References

Pool C
2022–23 in English rugby union
2022–23 in French rugby union
2022 in South African rugby union
2022 in Fijian rugby union